Kondolov Peak is the mostly ice-covered peak of elevation 900 m in Solvay Mountains on Brabant Island in the Palmer Archipelago, Antarctica.  It has steep and partly ice-free southwest and northwest slopes, and surmounts Jenner Glacier to the southeast, Duperré Bay to the southwest and Dimkov Glacier to the west-northwest.

The peak is named after Georgi Kondolov (1858-1903), a leader of the Bulgarian liberation movement in Thrace and Macedonia.

Location
British mapping in 1980 and 2008.

Maps
 Antarctic Digital Database (ADD). Scale 1:250000 topographic map of Antarctica. Scientific Committee on Antarctic Research (SCAR). Since 1993, regularly upgraded and updated.
British Antarctic Territory. Scale 1:200000 topographic map. DOS 610 Series, Sheet W 64 62. Directorate of Overseas Surveys, Tolworth, UK, 1980.
Brabant Island to Argentine Islands. Scale 1:250000 topographic map. British Antarctic Survey, 2008.

References
 Bulgarian Antarctic Gazetteer. Antarctic Place-names Commission. (details in Bulgarian, basic data in English)
 Kondolov Peak. SCAR Composite Antarctic Gazetteer

External links
 Kondolov Peak. Copernix satellite image

Mountains of the Palmer Archipelago
Bulgaria and the Antarctic